Rodrigo Andrade Cândido (born 22 May 1986 in Curitiba), known as Digão or simply Rodrigo, is a Brazilian footballer who plays as a left back.

External links

1986 births
Living people
Footballers from Curitiba
Brazilian footballers
Association football defenders
Campeonato Brasileiro Série A players
Campeonato Brasileiro Série B players
Campeonato Brasileiro Série C players
Paraná Clube players
Pato Branco Esporte Clube players
J. Malucelli Futebol players
Goiás Esporte Clube players
Grêmio Barueri Futebol players
Esporte Clube Pelotas players
Atlético Clube Paranavaí players
Associação Portuguesa de Desportos players
União Esporte Clube players